Teresa Łubieńska, née Skarżyńska (Russian Poland, 18 April 1884 – London, 25 May 1957), was a social activist, Resistance fighter – lieutenant in the Polish Underground Army – and survivor of two Nazi concentration camps. After World War II, she settled in England, where she worked on behalf of Nazi-German camp survivors. In May 1957, she was the victim of an unprovoked and fatal stabbing at London's Gloucester Road tube station. The assailant was never traced.

Biography 

Born into a noble Polish family in South-eastern Poland, she was the daughter of Władysław Skarżyński and his wife, Dorota Gołębiowska. Teresa was educated at Jazłowiec College, an élite Catholic boarding school for girls, run by the Sisters of the Immaculate Conception, in Jazłowiec in the Podole region. In 1902 she married Edward Łubieński (1871–1919), a member of a once powerful clan and went to live on the family estate in Łaszów. They had a son, Stanisław, born in 1906 followed by a daughter, Izabela, born in 1910. There, Teresa became an active member of the Polish Red Cross and continued supporting the 14th Regiment of Jazlowiec Uhlans, an association dating from her school days. She was widowed in 1919. Her son attended a military academy and passed out as a cavalry officer, later killed in the September campaign of 1939. Early during the German occupation of Poland in World War II Teresa moved to Warsaw and lived at no. 6 Sierpnia Street. During the occupation, she organised assistance for the civilian population of the capital. Her flat was also the venue of clandestine meetings of the Polish resistance cells. In 1942, she was betrayed to the Nazi authorities, arrested and taken to the Pawiak prison for interrogation. From there, she was sent to Auschwitz concentration camp and later moved to Ravensbrück concentration camp where her death sentence was commuted owing to the timely intervention of the Swedish Red Cross.

After liberation, Łubieńska came to the United Kingdom along with thousands of other displaced persons from German camps. She settled in London where she resumed her work on behalf of war-time prisoners and sought compensation for them. Łubieńska was a close friend of World War II British agent, Krystyna Skarbek, also known as 'Christine Granville', who was murdered by a stalker and whose funeral she attended at Kensal Green Cemetery in June 1952.

Fatal attack 

Teresa Łubieńska was stabbed five times on the evening of 24 May 1957 on the eastbound Piccadilly line platform at Gloucester Road, in an unprovoked attack on her way home from dinner with friends in Ealing. Until the previous stop at Earl's Court, she had been in the company of a Polish army chaplain, Fr. K. Krzyżanowski (himself a survivor of Dachau concentration camp). A few days before her death, she had told friends that she had been to the police to tell them that she felt threatened and that her life could be at risk. The Police subsequently carried out 18,000 interviews in the course of their murder investigations. Her death remains a mystery. Teresa Łubieńska died in St Mary Abbots Hospital, Kensington in the night of 25 May 1957. She was buried at Brompton Cemetery in London.  In 2021, the case was the subject of Episode 6 of Railway Murders.

References

External links

 http://www.gettyimages.co.uk/detail/video/picture-of-countess-teresa-lubienska-stabbed-at-news-footage/193-57-08
 http://www.polishnews.com/index.php?option=com_content&view=article&catid=93:histor (historical background to Countess Lubienska's war-time connections)
 http://www.ulanijazlowieccy.pl/index.php?categoryid=47

1884 births
1957 deaths
1957 murders in the United Kingdom
Polish activists
Polish countesses
Nobility from Warsaw
Ravensbrück concentration camp survivors
Auschwitz concentration camp survivors
Polish resistance members of World War II
Polish women in World War II resistance
Assassinations in the United Kingdom
Polish people murdered abroad
Polish emigrants to the United Kingdom
People murdered in London
Deaths by stabbing in London
Burials at Brompton Cemetery
Unsolved murders in the United Kingdom
Home Army officers
Polish women activists
Violence against women in London
Female murder victims
1950s murders in London
20th-century Polish nobility